Ponnamaravathi is a town in Pudukkottai district in the Indian state of Tamil Nadu. The town holds the status of Taluk. It is located 37 km from the district headquarter Pudukkottai and 410 km from state capital Chennai.

Historical References:

The Mahavamsa states that a 3 storeyed palace in ponnamaravathy destroyed by war between 3 kings here.

Silapathikaram states that Kovalan and Kannagi rested in Alagiyanatchi amman kovil here when they on their way to Madurai.

Etymology 

The name "Ponnamaravathy" comes from its rulers "Ponnan" and "Amaran".

Geography
Ponnamaravathy Taluk is located at the border of the Pudukkottai and Sivaganga districts. Pudukkottai, Natham, Karaikudi, Sivaganga, Madurai and Trichy are the nearby towns to Ponnamaravathi.

The town consists of three major habitations, Ponnamaravathy, Valayapatti and Pudhupatti. Of them the major commercial activities are concentrated in the habitation of Ponnamaravathi, which has separate streets for each particular mode of commercial activity. Pudhupatti and Valayapatti, has residential land use to a greater extent. Most of the houses in this region are built in the Chettinadu architectural style.

Economy
Ponnamaravathi is the main market centre for hundreds of adjoining villages.

Transport
The town has one bus stand named Kamaraj Bus Stand. This bus stand is classified as "C" class bus stand, per day 120 buses are plying over the bus stand and around six thousand public are benefited by this. Buses are often available for Pudukkottai (37 km), karaikudi (46 km), Madurai (70 km), Trichy (76 km) and Dindigul (87 km). Private and stated owned State Express Transport Corporation (Tamil Nadu) operates long-distance buses connecting the town to important cities like Chennai and Bangalore.

Pudukkottai railway station (37 km) is the nearest railway station, its connected by regular trains from Chennai and Rameswaram. Tiruchirappalli International Airport (77 km) is the nearest airport.

Education
The town has public and private schools for primary and higher secondary education. There are also arts and science colleges, polytechnic colleges and engineering colleges nearby. Ponnamaravathi Town Panchayat has a literacy rate of 83.95%, which is much higher than the national average of 64.8%.

Tourism 
Ponnamaravathi has Shri Malaiyandi Kovil of Lord Vinayaka. The town has large number of historical landmarks revealing the ancient traits of the town. The ancient Rajendra Chozhiswarar Sivan Temple in the town was built by Raja Raja Cholan II (reign, 1146 - 1173 AD).

The town also has a large man made tank named after the king Amarkandan, it's called as "Amarkandan Oorani".

References

Cities and towns in Pudukkottai district